Bukit Batok West MRT station is a future elevated Mass Rapid Transit (MRT) station on the Jurong Region Line located along the boundary of Bukit Batok and Jurong East planning areas, Singapore.

History

On 9 May 2018, LTA announced that Bukit Batok West station would be part of the proposed Jurong Region line (JRL). The station will be constructed as part of Phase 2, JRL (East), consisting of 7 stations between Tengah and Pandan Reservoir, and is expected to be completed in 2028.

Contract J108 for the design and construction of Bukit Batok West Station and associated viaducts was awarded to John Holland Pty Ltd – McConnell Dowell South East Asia Pte Ltd Joint Venture (JV) at a sum of S$265.4 million in March 2020. Construction will start in 2020, with completion in 2028. Contract J108 also includes the design and construction of Tengah Plantation Station and Tengah Park Station, and associated viaducts.

Initially expected to open in 2027, the restrictions on the construction due to the COVID-19 pandemic has led to delays in the JRL line completion, and the date was pushed to 2028.

Location
The station complex will be situated next to the PIE slip road at the junction with Bukit Batok Road and Jurong Town Hall Road. It is located in the Bukit Batok planning area in Bukit Batok West Subzone, parallel to the PIE, surrounded by housing estate to the north and south.

Access to the station will be via 5 exits located either side of the PIE.

References

Mass Rapid Transit (Singapore) stations
Proposed railway stations in Singapore
Railway stations scheduled to open in 2028